Stephen A. Brady (July 14, 1851 – November 1, 1917) was a Major League Baseball player who was both an infielder and outfielder from 1874 to 1890. He would play for the Hartford Dark Blues, Washington Nationals, and New York Metropolitans.

External links

1851 births
1917 deaths
Major League Baseball outfielders
Baseball players from Worcester, Massachusetts
Hartford Dark Blues players
Washington Nationals (NA) players
New York Metropolitans players
19th-century baseball players
Rochester (minor league baseball) players
Springfield (minor league baseball) players
Worcester Grays players
New York Metropolitans (minor league) players
Hartford Dark Blues (minor league) players
Jersey City Skeeters players
Jersey City Jerseys players